[[File:King Pharasmanes on Fasti Ostienses.jpg|thumb|A fragment of the Fasti Ostienses that mentions Pharasmanes II of Iberia.

PHARASMAN[ES REX IBERORVM CVM FILIO]
E ET VXORE PHR[CVI IMP(ERATOR) ANTONINVS AVG(VSTVS) REGNVM]
REDDIDIT
Translation:
Pharasman[es, the king of Iberia with the son]
and his wife Phr[to whom the emp[eror] Antoninus Aug[ustus], the kingdom]
restored.]]

The Fasti Ostienses''' are a calendar of Roman magistrates and significant events from 49 BC to AD 175, found at Ostia, the principal seaport of Rome.  Together with similar inscriptions, such as the Fasti Capitolini and Fasti Triumphales at Rome, the Fasti Ostienses form part of a chronology known as the Fasti Consulares, or Consular Fasti.

The Fasti Ostienses were originally engraved on marble slabs in a public place, either the Ostian forums, or the temple of Vulcan, the tutelary deity of Ostia.  The fasti were later dismantled and used as building materials.  Since their rediscovery, they have become one of the primary sources for the chronology of the early Roman Empire, along with historians such as Tacitus, Suetonius, and Cassius Dio.

History
The term fasti originally referred to calendars published by the pontifices, indicating the days on which business could be transacted (fasti) and those on which it was prohibited for religious reasons (nefasti).  These calendars frequently included lists of the annual magistrates.  In many ancient cultures, the most common way to refer to individual years was by the names of the presiding magistrates.  The annually-elected consuls were the eponymous magistrates at Rome, and so lists of the consuls going back many years were useful for dating historical events.  Over time such lists also became known as fasti.Oxford Classical Dictionary, 2nd Ed., pp. 429, 430 ("Fasti").

Located at the mouth of the Tiber, Ostia was the chief seaport of Rome from the earliest period until the third century AD, when it was overtaken by Portus.  The Fasti Ostienses were inscribed in a public place somewhere in the city, although precisely where is uncertain; perhaps in the local forum, or on the walls of the temple of Vulcan, the location of which has not been identified.  In either case, they were probably superintended by the Pontifex Volkani, the priest of Vulcan at Ostia.  The surviving fragments of the Ostienses mention this appointment several times.  The carving of the Ostian fasti may have begun as early as the dictatorship of Sulla, in 81 BC, but the earliest surviving portion records the events from 49 to 44 BC.  The last extant year is AD 175, but there are many gaps, and most of the surviving years are damaged.

It is not clear at what time the fasti were dismantled for reuse as building material; they may have been abandoned as early as the Severan dynasty, but more likely this occurred following the advent of Christianity as the state religion toward the end of the fourth century, or still later, when the city came under threat from raids from both land and sea during the fifth century.  However, from the ninth century to the nineteenth, the old city was effectively abandoned, and regarded largely as a source of material for construction elsewhere.

Contents
For each year, the Ostienses provide a list of the consuls, including both of the ordinares, the consuls who entered office at the beginning of January, and traditionally gave their names to the year, followed by all of the suffecti, consuls who took office following the resignation or death of their predecessors in the course of the year.Bruun, "Civic Rituals in Imperial Ostia", pp. 134–135.  Under the Republic, consules suffecti were elected only if one of the ordinares died, or was forced to resign.  But in imperial times, it became common for the emperors to appoint two, four, or even six pairs of consuls during the course of a year.

Part of the reason for increasing the number of consuls was to show favour to the Roman aristocracy, for whom holding the consulship for even a short period was a great honour; but the more practical reason was to fill the large number of important positions in the imperial bureaucracy that were traditionally held by ex-consuls.

Typically, each pair of consuls would enter office at the beginning, or Kalends, of a month, although sometimes consuls would take office on the Ides or Nones, or on rare occasions between these dates.  Most of the emperors held the consulship several times, typically serving as one of the ordinares, and then resigning, often as early as the Ides of January.

In addition to the consuls, the Ostienses listed the local duumviri jure dicundo, the chief magistrates of Ostia, who were also tasked with carrying out the census every fifth year.  Prefects are also mentioned in a few years, but these also appear to have been local officials, often bearing the names of the same families who regularly supplied the city's duumvirs.

Inserted between the Roman consuls and Ostian magistrates, the Ostienses describe important occasions, such as events relating to the emperor or the imperial family, the deaths of notable individuals, and the dedication of statues and temples.  The main focus is on events at Rome, although several events of local significance to Ostians are also recorded, including the appointment of new Priests of Vulcan, and the donation of congiaria.

Although the surviving portions of the fasti cover a period of nearly two hundred and twenty five years, only about eighty-five years are partially preserved.  Moreover, contrary to the Fasti Capitolini, these fasti did not record the consuls' filiations, making prosopography of the Empire more difficult.  Nonetheless, the Fasti Ostienses are immensely valuable as a source for the names and chronology of many of the consuls who held office under the empire.

Transcription
The following tables give the magistrates and events from the most recent reconstruction of the Fasti Ostienses.  The years provided in the columns on the left are based on modern scholarship; the original inscription does not provide years.  Portions of names and text in square brackets have been interpolated.  Periods (full stops) have been supplied for abbreviations.  Missing text is indicated with an ellipsis in brackets, [...].  These tables use modern conventions for distinguishing between I and J, and between U and V.  Otherwise, the names and notes are given as spelled in the fasti.

Magistracies
 Coss. = consules, consuls
 Suf. = consules suffecti IIviri = duumviri, duumvirs
 c. p. q. = censoria potestate quinquennales, with the authority to take the quinquennial census
 Praef. = praefecti, prefects
 p. c. = patronus coloniae, patron of the colony
 p. p. c. = patronus perpetuus coloniae, perpetual patron of the colony
 Kal. = ex Kalendis, from the Kalends, or a. d.  Kalendas, the 'x' day before the Kalends (the first day of each month).
 Non. = ex Nonis, from the Nones, or a. d.  Nonas, the 'x' day before the Nones (the seventh day of March, May, July, and October, and the fifth of all other months).
 Id. = ex Idibus, from the Ides, or a. d.  Idus, the 'x' day before the Ides (the fifteenth day of March, May, July, and October, and the thirteenth of all other months).

Praenomina
The following praenomina appear in the Fasti Ostienses.  Most were regularly abbreviated.

 A. = Aulus
 Ap. = Appius
 C. = Gaius
 Cn. = Gnaeus
 Faustus (not abbreviated)
 L. = Lucius
 M. = Marcus
 M'. = Manius
 P. = Publius
 Q. = Quintus
 Ser. = Servius
 Sex. = Sextus
 T. = Titus
 Ti. = Tiberius

First century BC

First century AD

Second century

References

Bibliography
 Theodor Mommsen et alii, Corpus Inscriptionum Latinarum (The Body of Latin Inscriptions, abbreviated CIL), Berlin-Brandenburgische Akademie der Wissenschaften (1853–present).
 Harper's Dictionary of Classical Literature and Antiquities, Harry Thurston Peck, ed. (Second Edition, 1897).
 Oxford Classical Dictionary, N. G. L. Hammond and H. H. Scullard, eds., Clarendon Press, Oxford (Second Edition, 1970).
 Ladislav Vidman, Fasti Ostienses: Edendos, Illustrandos, Restituendos Curavit, second edition, Československá Akademie, Prague (1982).
 Bernhard Brehmer, "Fasti Ostienses", in Brill's New Pauly (2006). 
 Christer Bruun, "Civic Rituals in Imperial Ostia", in Ritual Dynamics and Religious Change in the Roman Empire, pp. 123–141, Koninklijke Brill NV, Leiden (2009).

External links
 "Calendar of Romulus", in The Roman Calendar.
 "Early Ostia", in Ostia: Harbour City of Rome].
 "Early Roman Calendar", in Calendars through the Ages.
 Grout, James Grout, "Fasti Antiates", in Encyclopedia Romana''.

Image credits
 "Fausto Zevi, 2001": http://www.ostia-antica.org/intro.htm#23
 http://www.webexhibits.org/calendars/year-text-Fasti.html

See also
 List of Roman consuls
 List of ancient Roman fasti
 Roman Calendar

 
Imperial Roman consuls
Lists of office-holders in ancient Rome
Ancient timelines
Roman calendar
Latin inscriptions
2nd-century inscriptions